Xanthomyrtus is a group of shrubs and trees in the botanical family Myrtaceae described as a genus in 1922. It is found in Borneo, Moluccas, Sulawesi, Philippines, New Guinea, Bismarck Archipelago and New Caledonia.

They are mostly montane shrubs or trees, sometimes epiphytic. Flowers are yellow, usually 5-merous, in 3-flowered, axillary and terminal peduncles. The fruit is a reddish, dark blue or black berry.

species

References 

Myrtaceae genera
Myrtaceae
Flora of Malesia
Flora of Papuasia